Castaic High School (CHS) is a high school in the unincorporated community of Castaic, California, in the Santa Clarita Valley. It is part of the William S. Hart Union High School District. The school officially opened in August 2019.

History
On March 28, 2018, the William S. Hart Union High School District named Melanie Hagman as the first principal of Castaic High School, its newest campus.

The district announced on October 10, 2018 that the school's new mascot would be the coyote and the colors would be charcoal gray, white, and burnt orange. Input was solicited from community stakeholders, including students from Castaic Middle School who would attend CHS.

Castaic High School opened its doors on August 13, 2019, to a freshman class of 325 students. The school has a capacity of 2,600.

On July 18, 2022, Superintendent Mike Kuhlman announced that Vince Ferry, former principal of Rio Norte Junior High School and Saugus High School, would be taking over as principal.

Academics
The Castaic High School campus hosts the iCAN Academy at Castaic High School, a middle college program operated by the Hart District in partnership with College of the Canyons (COC). The program consists of a rigorous curriculum that allows students to earn college credit all four years of high school. Unlike the district's other such program, Academy of the Canyons on the COC campus, iCAN students may participate in a full range of extracurricular activities including interscholastic athletics.

Student demographics
As of the 2021-22 school year, 1,026 students (freshmen, sophomores, and juniors) were enrolled at Castaic High School. Of those, 44.3% were Hispanic, 40.0% were non-Hispanic white, 7.7% were Asian American, and 3.2% were African American. As of 2020-21, 203 students (27.7%) were eligible for free or reduced-price lunch.

Athletics
Castaic High School athletic teams are nicknamed the Coyotes. The school competes in the Foothill League with its fellow Hart District schools. The school fielded 17 teams in its first school year, all at the freshman level only.

References

External links

Public high schools in Los Angeles County, California
2019 establishments in California
Educational institutions established in 2019